Brod-Posavina County is the southern Slavonian county in Croatia. Its center is the city of Slavonski Brod and it spreads along the left bank of the Sava river, hence the name Posavina. Other notable towns include Nova Gradiška.

Geography

The Brod-Posavina County borders on the Sisak-Moslavina County in the west, Požega-Slavonia County in the north, Osijek-Baranja County in the northeast, and Vukovar-Syrmia County in the east.

Administrative divisions

Brod-Posavina County is divided into:

 City of Slavonski Brod (county seat)
 Town of Nova Gradiška
 Municipality of Bebrina
 Municipality of Brodski Stupnik
 Municipality of Bukovlje
 Municipality of Cernik 
 Municipality of Davor
 Municipality of Donji Andrijevci
 Municipality of Dragalić
 Municipality of Garčin
 Municipality of Gornja Vrba
 Municipality of Gornji Bogićevci
 Municipality of Gundinci
 Municipality of Klakar
 Municipality of Nova Kapela
 Municipality of Okučani
 Municipality of Oprisavci           
 Municipality of Oriovac
 Municipality of Podcrkavlje
 Municipality of Rešetari
 Municipality of Sibinj
 Municipality of Sikirevci
 Municipality of Slavonski Šamac
 Municipality of Stara Gradiška
 Municipality of Staro Petrovo Selo
 Municipality of Velika Kopanica
 Municipality of Vrbje
 Municipality of Vrpolje

Demographics

As of the 2011 census, the county had 158,575 residents. The population density is 78 people per km2.

Ethnic Croats form the majority with 95.0% of the population, followed by Serbs at 2.6%.

References

External links
 

 
Counties of Croatia
Slavonia